José Geraldo de Castro, commonly known as  Zé Geraldo (born 18 September 1950) is a Brazilian former professional basketball player. With the senior Brazilian national basketball team, Geraldo competed at the 1968 Summer Olympics, the 1972 Summer Olympics, and the 1974 FIBA World Cup.

References

1950 births
Living people
Basketball players at the 1968 Summer Olympics
Basketball players at the 1972 Summer Olympics
Brazilian men's basketball players
Esporte Clube Sírio basketball players
Franca Basquetebol Clube players
Olympic basketball players of Brazil
Small forwards
Sport Club Corinthians Paulista basketball players
Basketball players from São Paulo
Sociedade Esportiva Palmeiras basketball players
20th-century Brazilian people